USS Casablanca (AVG/ACV/CVE-55) was the first of fifty s built for the United States Navy during World War II. She was named after the Naval Battle of Casablanca, conducted as a part of the wider Operation Torch, which pitted the United States Navy against the remnants of the French Navy controlled by Vichy France. The American victory cleared the way for the seizure of the port of Casablanca as well as the Allied occupation of French Morocco. The ship was launched in April 1943, commissioned in July, and served as a training and transport carrier throughout the war. Postwar, she participated in Operation Magic Carpet, repatriating U.S. servicemen from throughout the Pacific. She was decommissioned in June 1946, when she was mothballed in the Atlantic Reserve Fleet. She was sold for scrap in April 1947.

Design and description

Casablanca was the lead ship of the Casablanca-class escort carriers, the most numerous type of aircraft carriers ever built, and designed specifically to be mass-produced using prefabricated sections, in order to replace heavy early war losses. She displaced  standard,  with a full load. She was powered with two Skinner Unaflow reciprocating steam engines, which drove two shafts, providing , thus enabling her to make . Power was provided by four Babcock & Wilcox water-tube boilers. Her compact size necessitated the installation of an aircraft catapult at her bow, and there were two aircraft elevators to facilitate movement of aircraft between the flight and hangar deck: one each fore and aft.

One /38 caliber dual-purpose gun was mounted on the stern. Anti-aircraft defense was provided by eight Bofors  anti-aircraft guns in single mounts, as well as 12 Oerlikon  cannons, which were mounted around the perimeter of the deck. By the end of the war, Casablanca-class carriers had been modified to carry thirty 20 mm cannons, and the amount of 40 mm guns had been doubled to sixteen, by putting them into twin mounts. These modifications were in response to increasing casualties due to kamikaze attacks. Although Casablanca-class escort carriers were designed to function with a crew of 860 and an embarked squadron of 50 to 56, the exigencies of wartime often necessitated the inflation of the crew count. Casablanca-class escort carriers were designed to carry 27 aircraft, but the hangar deck could accommodate more, which was often necessary during transport or especially training missions, due to the constant turnover of pilots and aircraft.

Construction

Her construction was awarded to Kaiser Shipbuilding Company, Vancouver, Washington, under a Maritime Commission contract, on 18 June 1942, with the classification symbol AVG-55, indicating that she would be the 55th escort carrier, AVG representing an aircraft escort vessel, numbered in the same series as the escort carriers. On 20 August, the future carrier was reclassified as ACV-55, the hull symbol representing an auxiliary aircraft carrier. The escort carrier was laid down on 3 November 1942 under the name Ameer, with the original plans calling for her transfer to the Royal Navy under the lend-lease program. She was laid down as MC hull 1092, the first of a series of fifty Casablanca-class escort carriers.

On 23 February 1943, it was determined that her sister ship , the second Casablanca-class carrier to be constructed would be transferred under lend-lease in Casablancas place. Therefore, she was renamed Alazon Bay, a misspelling of Alazan Bay, located in Kleberg County, Texas, as part of a tradition which named escort carriers after bays or sounds. She was then further renamed to Casablanca on 3 April, with her previous name later being assigned to the hull of her sister . She was launched on 5 April; sponsored by the First Lady Mrs. Eleanor Roosevelt; transferred to the Navy on 8 July, commissioned and reclassified as CVE-55 on 15 July, with Commander Steven Ward Callaway in command.

Service history

Upon being commissioned, it was discovered that Casablanca had a propeller defect, handicapping her speed and handling, which rendered her completely unsuitable for frontline or even transport service. Therefore, the Navy used her as a training vessel, operating in the Strait of Juan de Fuca to provide pilot certifications. For the next year, until August 1944, a steady stream of carrier squadrons were trained on board Casablanca, rotating off for service on a frontline carrier once they had finished qualifications. In addition, she was used as a training vessel for crews bound for the other Casablanca-class carriers prior to commissioning, with crews typically spending two weeks learning how to operate the equipment and how to maneuver the ship. These crews would therefore report for service on their newly commissioned Casablanca-class carriers with a modicum of experience. The Navy also used Casablanca as a ship to gather data on how the escort carriers fared during prolonged periods at sea, measuring her material readiness and the ability of her equipment. Lessons learned on Casablanca were therefore implemented on Casablanca-class carriers to come.

In the summer of 1944, Casablanca was put into dry dock, and her propeller defect was corrected. Hence, she was certified to begin transport missions. On 24 August, after taking on a load of personnel, airplanes, and aviation gasoline at Naval Air Station Alameda, she put through the Golden Gate Bridge, and passed San Francisco en route to Manus Island in the Admiralty Islands. She returned to Seattle on 8 October, and immediately continued her previous duties in Puget Sound as a training carrier, carrying out much of the same activities, this time preparing the pre-commissioning crews of s. During this period, she was damaged by a storm, and proceeded into San Diego harbor on 22 January 1945 for repairs. On 12 February, Captain John Lewis Murphy raised his flag over the vessel.

Casablanca returned to sea on 13 March, and with her repairs completed, she proceeded westwards for another transport mission. Stopping at Pearl Harbor, she headed to Guam, where she unloaded some of her cargo. She then carried out transport runs between Samar in the Philippines, Manus, and Palau until 12 May, when she proceeded back to the West Coast for overhaul, carrying on board a load of medically unfit personnel. Upon arrival, she replenished and was sent west again, delivering passengers to Pearl Harbor on 24 June. She spent the summer making transport runs from the West Coast to Pearl Harbor and Guam. During one of these transport missions, whilst arriving at Guam, the Surrender of Japan was announced.

After a brief period in which Casablanca yet again served as a training carrier providing pilot qualifications off of Saipan in August, she was retrofitted into a troopship, and joined the Operation Magic Carpet fleet, which repatriated U.S. servicemen from around the Pacific. Her first run concluded in San Francisco on 24 September. She then ferried some personnel to Pearl Harbor in September and October. At Pearl Harbor, she made her second run, stopping at Espiritu Santo and Nouméa, repatriating servicemen to the West Coast. Her third and final run, which ran from 8 December to 16 January 1946, was a run from San Francisco to Yokohama, occupied Japan.

Casablanca left San Francisco harbor on 23 January, proceeding to Norfolk, Virginia, arriving on 10 February. There, she was mothballed in the Atlantic Reserve Fleet on 30 May. She was decommissioned on 10 June, and struck from the Navy list on 3 July. She was sold on 23 April 1947 for scrapping, ultimately being broken up in Chester, Pennsylvania, throughout the latter half of 1947.

Notes

References

Sources

Online sources

Bibliography

External links 

 

 

Casablanca-class escort carriers
World War II escort aircraft carriers of the United States
Ships built in Vancouver, Washington
1943 ships
S4-S2-BB3 ships